Elvis (Original Motion Picture Soundtrack) is the soundtrack album to the biographical film Elvis, based on the life of American singer-actor Elvis Presley. The soundtrack was released by RCA Records on June 24, 2022, the same day as the film's theatrical release. The album is produced by Baz Luhrmann and Anton Monstead who also worked on the soundtrack of The Great Gatsby. It comprises 36 tracks (online version, the CD version contains 22 tracks), while featuring actual recordings of Presley's songs, it also features few tracks performed by Austin Butler (who portrays Presley in the film), and several popular artists, namely Doja Cat, Eminem, Diplo, Stevie Nicks, Jack White, Swae Lee amongst others. The album also features variations on Presley material by big name artists in a variety of genres and styles. It consists of a mix of genres, including pop, rock and roll, jazz, R&B and hip hop. The album spawned five singles: "Vegas", "Trouble", "The King and I", "If I Can Dream", and "Tupelo Shuffle".

The soundtrack  garnered a nomination for the Grammy Award for Best Compilation Soundtrack for Visual Media, as well as being chosen as 2022's  best soundtrack by both the Hollywood Music in Media Awards and the American Music Awards.

Production 
The film's soundtrack was expected to consist of Presley's recordings, however Luhrmann planned to include modern artists and their renditions with hip hop beats, infusing of jazz and rock music from the 20th century. Luhrmann stated that it was a way of illustrating the radical impact of Presley's sound on current generation of audiences, a technique he did in the soundtrack to The Great Gatsby, in which executive producer Jay-Z had infused hip hop beats with jazz music, while in the novel on which the film is based, Fitzgerald wrote African-American street music and jazz numbers.

The incidental underscore is composed by Elliot Wheeler. Before scoring the film, Wheeler had to listen over several recordings and musicals of Presley, to interpret the feel of the music, which Wheeler had stated "You get to treat the script as music, and music as the script. All the musical choices were made to emphasise where Baz wanted the scene to get emotionally." Both Wheeler and Luhrmann had access to the full catalogue of Elvis' recordings where they were able to separate the vocals from the backing instruments, and enables them to resurface the songs and turn them into a soundtrack for a different century. Wheeler expressed that "What we've tried to do with this film is give [modern audiences] a take on what it must have felt like to see Elvis in his prime. There's a nostalgia people associate with those recordings. But we're trying to show a 21st-century audience how Elvis changed Western culture".

Songs 
The film features several recordings of Elvis Presley, performed by the ensemble cast members, as revealed in the June 18, 2022 magazine guide published by Variety. Prior to the release, Luhrmann also stated that the film had unfiltered versions of Presley's songs, performed by Butler and hybrid versions of songs that blend Butler's voice with Presley's recordings. However, those songs will not be included in the album. Stevie Nicks recorded the track "Cotton Candy Land", a song featured in the film It Happened at the World’s Fair (1963) and not released as a single. "A Fool Such as I", rendered by Chris Isaak, was originally performed by Hank Snow. His original version reached the fourth position on the country chart in 1953. "Black Snake Moan" and "That's All Right" were performed by Gary Clark Jr. "How Do You Think I Feel" was rendered by Kodi Smit-McPhee, who plays Jimmie Rodgers. "Hound Dog" was recorded by Shonka Dukureh (as Big Mama Thornton) in the film, and "Tiger Man" was performed by Rufus Thomas. Yola who played Sister Rosetta Tharpe, records two songs "Working on the Building" and "Strange Things Happening Every Day".

Promotion and release 
Prior to the soundtrack release, the album topped the new music releases of the week (June 24–30), according to a report by Cleveland Magazine. The soundtrack was published by RCA Records on June 24, 2022, coinciding with the film's theatrical release. Variety magazine released a special music insight about the album and Presley's songs in the film, as did NME with their special issue dedicated to the film.

Singles 
On April 25, 2022, it was announced that Doja Cat would contribute an original song for the film "Vegas", that incorporates elements from Presley's own songs, such as his cover of Big Mama Thornton's "Hound Dog". It was released as a single on May 6, 2022. The music video of the track was released on June 3, featuring Cat along with a cameo by Shonka Dukureh, who plays Thornton in the film.

On May 23, 2022, rapper Eminem announced on his Instagram that he and CeeLo Green will collaborate on a new track titled "The King and I" which will be produced by Dr. Dre and will appear on the film's soundtrack. The single, prior to its release on June 16, 2022, was unveiled as a first listen in the 2022 Cannes Film Festival. The track sampled Presley's "Jailhouse Rock". The lyrics describe on the rise and fall of Presley, from catapulting to stardom to his arrest". Through the lyrics, Eminem said that "he had a parallel connection with Presley as the latter used to rock the 'jailhouse' and he used to rock the 'shelter'", while also referencing about their "accusations" on stealing Black music.

The single "Tupelo Shuffle" performed by Swae Lee and Diplo was released on June 3, 2022. Lee and Diplo further performed the track at the 2022 MTV Movie & TV Awards on June 5. Butler's rendition of "Trouble" was released as the single on June 10. Italian band Måneskin and Kacey Musgraves are also part of the soundtrack with their respective cover versions of "If I Can Dream" and "Can't Help Falling in Love". The tracks were released as singles on June 16 and 22, respectively. Måneskin explained their work on the song, and collaboration with Luhrmann, saying: "We were talking about it with Baz Luhrmann, who had this really cool, super-smart idea, because it would have been so easy to give us an up-tempo song and go super rock-ish. He saw that between the lines that we were going to be able to give something else to show the sweet side of Elvis." The band further stated about the track: "It is about uniting, it's about peace, freedom and happiness".

Reception 
Kyle Buchanan, writer at The New York Times, tweeted after the film's Cannes premiere, saying "the soundtrack features a song which interpolates Presley with both the Backstreet Boys' 'Everybody (Backstreet's Back)' and Britney Spears' 'Toxic', and you'd be hard pressed to find anything more Luhrmann than that".<ref>{{Cite tweet|number=1529554262807785475|user=kylebuchanan|title=I told someone that Baz Luhrmann’s Elvis' interpolates an Elvis song with "Backstreet's Back" and Britney's "Toxic" and he looked at me gobsmacked. But I was shocked he was shocked! It's Baz Luhrmann's Elvis! That's practically the center square of the bingo card!|author=Kyle Buchanan}}</ref> Stephanie Anderson, writing for The Latch called it "another iconic Luhrmann soundtrack". The album, released on June 24, 2022, entered the Billboard'' Soundtrack Albums chart at #1 on its July 9, 2022 issue, as well as charting at number 26 on the Billboard 200. After a few weeks inside the top ten, it then returned to the top of Soundtrack  chart, as well as landed on number 27, as reported  on the Billboard 200's August 13, 2022 issue.

Track listing 
On June 10, 2022, the track listing for the film's soundtrack, consisting of thirty-six tracks, surfaced online via Apple Music.

Charts

Weekly charts

Year-end charts

Awards and nominations

References 

2022 soundtrack albums
Elvis Presley tribute albums
Pop soundtracks
Rock-and-roll albums
Jazz soundtracks
Rhythm and blues soundtracks
RCA Records soundtracks
Hip hop soundtracks